Winscombe Street refers to a terrace of five houses in Camden, London, England, designed by the architect Neave Brown for himself and a collective of four other families. It is Grade II listed and was the precursor for the house and maisonette designs used in Dunboyne Road Estate and Alexandra Road Estate.

Design
These are three-storey three bedroom houses designed to the Parker Morris space standards. In a 'contemporary house' the kitchen is the central room. Neave placed the kitchen on the middle floor, with a terrace and steps down to a shared garden. The children's bedrooms are placed below, and open directly through stable doors, which double as windows into the garden. The parents bedroom and living room are on the floor above- the living room looking out over the garden.

References

Grade II listed buildings in the London Borough of Camden
Houses in the London Borough of Camden